Mariano Rivera Paz (24 December 1804 – 26 February 1849) was Head of State of Guatemala and its first president.

Biography 

Mariano Rivera Paz was born in Guatemala City and studied law in the Royal and Pontifical University of San Carlos Borromeo.

Conflagration between Liberals and Conservatives 
In 1838 the liberal forces of Morazan and José Francisco Barrundia invaded Guatemala and reached San Sur, where they executed Chúa Alvarez, father-in-law of the Guatemalan military leader Rafael Carrera and laid his head on a pike to teach a lesson to all followers of the Guatemalan caudillo. Upon learnings this, Carrera and his wife Petrona - had come to confront Morazán as soon as they learned of the invasion and were in Mataquescuintla- swore they would never forgive Morazan even in his grave, as they felt that no one could respect someone who could not avenge family members. After sending several envoys, who Carrera would not receive -especially Barrundia who was not received because Carrera did not want to murder him in cold blood- Morazán began a strong scorched earth offensive, destroying villages in his path and stripping them of their few assets, thus forcing Carrera forces to hide in the mountains. Believing that Carrera was totally defeated, Morazán and Barrundia marched on to Guatemala City where they were welcomed as saviors by the state governor Pedro Valenzuela and members of the conservative Aycinena Clan, who even proposed to sponsor one of the liberal battalions, while Valenzuela and Barrundia gave Morazán all the Guatemalan resources needed to solve any financial problem he had. The criollos of both parties celebrated until dawn that they finally had a caudillo like Morazan, who was able to crush the peasant rebellion. Morazán used the proceeds to support Los Altos and then replaced Valenzuela by Rivera Paz, member of the Aycinena clan, although he did not return to that clan any property confiscated in 1829; in revenge, Juan José de Aycinena y Piñol voted for the dissolution of the Central American Federation in San Salvador a little later, thereby forcing Morazán to return to El Salvador to fight for his dying federal mandate. Along the way, Morazán increased repression in eastern Guatemala, as punishment for helping Carrera, whom he considered expired. Knowing that Morazán had gone to El Salvador, Carrera tried to take Salamá with the small force that remained, but was defeated, losing his brother Laureano in combat. With just a few men left, he managed to escape, badly wounded, to Sanarate. After recovering a little bit, attacked a detachment in Jutiapa and managed to get a little booty which he handed to the volunteers who accompanied him and prepared to attack Petapa -near Guatemala City-, where he triumphed, but with heavy casualties . In September of that year, Carrera attempted an assault on the capital of Guatemala, but the liberal general Carlos Salazar Castro defeated him in the fields of Villa Nueva and Carrera had to retreat.  After an unsuccessful attempt to take Quetzaltenango, Carrera was surrounded and wounded, and he had to capitulate to the Mexican General Agustin Guzman, who lay in Quetzaltenango since the time of Vicente Filísola arrival in 1823. Morazán had the opportunity to shoot him, but could not because he needed the support of the Guatemalan peasants to counter the attacks of Francisco Ferrera in El Salvador; instead, Morazán left Carrera in charge of a minute fort in Mita, and without any weapons. Knowing that Morazán was going to attack El Salvador, Francisco Ferrera gave a thousand arms and ammunition to Carrera and convinced him to attack Guatemala City.

Meanwhile, despite insistent advice to definitely crush Carrera and his forces, Salazar tried to negotiate with him diplomatically;  he even went as far as to show that he neither feared nor distrusted Carrera by removing removed the fortifications that were in place in the Guatemalan capital since the battle of Villa Nueva. Taking advantage of Salazar's good faith and Ferrera's weapons, Carrera caught by surprise Guatemala City on April 13, 1839; at that moment, Castro Salazar, Mariano Gálvez and Barrundia fled before the arrival of Carrera militia men. Salazar, in his nightshirt, vaulted roofs of neighboring houses and sought refuge;  then, as he could, he reached the border disguised as a peasant and fled Guatemala. With Salazar gone, Carrera reinstated Rivera Paz as Head of State of Guatemala

Invasion and absorption of Los Altos 

On April 2 of 1838, in the city of Quetzaltenango, a secessionist group founded the independent State of Los Altos which seeks independence from Guatemala. The most important members of the Liberal Party of Guatemala and liberal enemies of the conservative regime moved to Los Altos, who no longer had to emigrate to El Salvador, having a pro liberal state practically in his country agglutinated  The liberals in Los Altos began harshly criticizing the Conservative government of Rivera Paz; even had their own newspaper -El Popular, which contributed to the harsh criticism. Moreover, there was the fact that Los Altos was the region with more production and economic activity of the former State of Guatemala; without Los Altos, conservatives lost many merits that held the hegemony of the State of Guatemala in Central America. Then, the government of Guatemala tried to reach to a peaceful solution, but altenses, protected by the recognition of the Central American Federation Congress, did not accept; Guatemala's government then resorted to force, sending the commanding general of the Army Rafael Carrera subdue Los Altos.

Carrera defeated General Agustin Guzman when the former Mexican officer tried to ambush him and then went on to Quetzaltenango, where he imposed a harsh and hostile conservative regime for liberals. Calling all council members, he told them flatly that he was behaving kindly to them for being that the first time they had challenged him, but sternly warned them that there would be no mercy if there was a second time. Finally, the general Guzmán, and the head of state of Los Altos, Marcelo Molina, were sent to the capital of Guatemala, where they were displayed as trophies of war during a triumphant parade on February 17, 1840; in the case of Guzman, shackled, still with bleeding wounds, and riding a mule.

Second invasion and Morazán's defeat 
 

On March 18, 1840, liberal caudillo Morazán invaded Guatemala with 1500 soldiers to avenge the insult done in Los Altos and fearing that such action would end with liberal efforts to hold together the Central American Federation. Guatemala had a cordon of guards from the border with El Salvador; without telegraph service, men ran carrying last minute messages. With the information from these messengers, Carrera hatched their plan of defense leaving his brother Sotero by troops who presented a slight resistance in the city. Carrera pretended to flee and led the ragtag army to the heights of Aceituno as only had about four men and the same number of loads rifle, plus two old cannons. The city was at the mercy of the army of Morazán, with bells of their twenty temples ringing for divine assistance. Once Morazán reached the capital, he took it easily and freed Guzman, who immediately left for Quetzaltenango to give the news that Carrera was defeated;  Carrera then, taking advantage of what his enemies believed, applied a strategy of concentrating fire on the Central Park of the city and also employed surprise attack tactics with which caused heavy casualties to the army of Morazán to finally force the survivors to fight for their lives. Now in such combat scenario, Morazán's soldiers lost the initiative and their numerical superiority. Furthermore, unaware of their surroundings in the city, Morazan's troops had to fight, carry their dead and care for their wounded while still resented being tired by the long march from El Salvador to Guatemala  Carrera, by then an experienced military men was able to stand up and defeat Morazán thoroughly. The disaster for the liberal general was complete:  aided by Angel Molina  who knew the streets of the city, had to flee with his favorite men, disguised  shouting "Long live Carrera!" through ravine of El Incienso to El Salvador, to save his life. In his absence, Morazán had been relieved as Head of State of that country, which is why he had to embark for exile in Perú. In Guatemala, survivors from his troops were shot without mercy, while Carrera was out in pursuit of Morazan, who he failed to catch. This lance definitely sealed the status of General Carrera and marked the decline of Morazán., and forced the conservative Aycinena clan criollos to negotiate with Carrera and his peasant revolutionary supporters.

Agustin Guzmán, who was freed by Morazán when the latter had seemingly defeated Carrera in Guatemala City, had gone back to Quetzaltenango to tell the good news.  The city liberal criollo leaders rapidly reinstated the Los Altos State and celebrated Morazán's victory.  However, as soon as Carrera and the newly reinstated Rivera Paz heard the news, Carrera went back to Quetzaltenango with his voluntary army to regain control of the rebel liberal state once and for all. On 2 April 1840, after entering the city, Carrera told the citizens that he had already warned them after he defeated them earlier that year.  Then, he ordered the majority of the liberal city hall officials from Los Altos to be shot on his orders. Carrera, then forcibly annexed Quetzaltenango and much of Los Altos back into conservative Guatemala. After the violent and bloody reinstatement of the State of Los Altos by Carrera in April 1840, Luis Batres Juarros -conservative member of the Aycinena Clan then secretary general of the Guatemalan government of recently reinstated Rivera Paz- obtained from the vicar Larrazabal authorization to dismantle the regionalist Church.  Acting priests of Quetzaltenango -capital of the would-be-state of Los Altos, priest Urban Ugarte and his coadjutor, priest José Maria Aguilar, were removed from their parish and likewise the priests of the parishes of San Martin Jilotepeque and San Lucas Tolimán. Larrazabal ordered the priests Fernando Antonio Dávila, Mariano Navarrete and Jose Ignacio Iturrioz to cover the parishes of Quetzaltenango, San Martin Jilotepeque and San Lucas Toliman, respectively.

The liberal criollos defeat and execution in Quetzaltenango reinforced Carrera ally status within the native population of the area, whom he respected and protected.

Presidency 

His term of office was in a time of great political turmoil for Guatemala, but he kept general Rafael Carrera by his side to help him. When hostilities started with El Salvador in June 1844, Rivera Paz closed the borders to prevent an invasion using inmates of the state border for these the watch over. In December 1844, Rivera Paz presented his irrevocable resignation to the Assembly due to the pressure and demands from Rafael Carrera.

Belgium's colonization attempt 
In 1840, Belgium began to act as an external source of support for his independence movement, in an effort to exert influence in Central America. The Compagnie belge de colonisation (Belgian Colonization Company), commissioned by Belgian King Leopold I, became the administrator of Santo Tomas de Castilla for a time, replacing the failed British Eastern Coast of Central America Commercial and Agricultural Company.

Death 

In eastern Guatemala, the Jalapa region became increasingly dangerous; rebel leader Vicente Cruz was murdered there after trying to take over the Corregidor office in 1849. On February 26, 1849, when Rivera Paz went to take possession of the provincial government of Jalapa, he was killed by the "Lucios" Roberto Reyes and Agustín Pérez in Sampaquisoy, Jalapa.

See also 

 Francisco Morazán
 Los Altos, Central America
 Presidents of Guatemala 
 Rafael Carrera

References

Bibliography

Notes 

 

1804 births
1849 deaths
Guatemalan politicians
19th-century Guatemalan people
Universidad de San Carlos de Guatemala alumni
Rafael Carrera